Cromers Wood is a   nature reserve between Milstead and Sittingbourne in Kent. It is managed by Kent Wildlife Trust.

This ancient semi-natural wood is located on the south-east slope of a dry valley. There are birds such as sparrowhawks, green woodpeckers and great spotted woodpeckers, and flora include early purple and common spotted orchids.

There is public access to the site.

References

Kent Wildlife Trust